Eleanor of England (– 31 October 1214), was Queen of Castile and Toledo as wife of Alfonso VIII of Castile. She was the sixth child and second daughter of Henry II, King of England, and Eleanor of Aquitaine.  She served as Regent of Castile during the minority of her son Henry I between the death of her spouse until her own death in 1214.

Early life and family

Eleanor was born in the castle at Domfront, Normandy c. 1161, as the second daughter of King Henry II of England and his wife Eleanor, Duchess of Aquitaine, and was baptised by Henry of Marcy. Her half-siblings were Countess Marie of Champagne and Countess Alix of Blois. Her full siblings were Henry the Young King, Duchess Matilda of Saxony, King Richard I, Duke Geoffrey II of Brittany, Queen Joan of Sicily and King John. Eleanor had an older brother, William (17 August 1153April 1156), the first son of Henry II, and Eleanor of Aquitaine, who died of a seizure at Wallingford Castle, and was buried in Reading Abbey at the feet of his great-grandfather Henry I.

Queenship

In 1170 Eleanor married King Alfonso VIII of Castile in Burgos at the age of 12. Her parents' purpose in arranging the marriage was to secure Aquitaine's Pyrenean border, while Alfonso sought an ally in his struggles with Sancho VI of Navarre.  In 1177, this led to Henry overseeing arbitration of the border dispute.

Around 1200, Alfonso began to claim that the duchy of Gascony was part of Eleanor's dowry, but there is no documented foundation for that claim.  It is highly unlikely that Henry II would have parted with so significant a portion of his domains. At most, Gascony may have been pledged as security for the full payment of his daughter's dowry. Her husband went so far on this claim as to invade Gascony in her name in 1205.  In 1206, her brother John granted her safe passage to visit him, perhaps to try opening peace negotiations.  In 1208, Alfonso yielded on the claim.  Decades later, their great-grandson Alfonso X of Castile would claim the duchy on the grounds that her dowry had never been fully paid.

Of all Eleanor of Aquitaine's daughters, her namesake was the only one who was enabled, by political circumstances, to wield the kind of influence her mother had exercised. In her marriage treaty, and in the first marriage treaty for her daughter Berengaria, Eleanor was given direct control of many lands, towns, and castles throughout the kingdom. She was almost as powerful as Alfonso, who specified in his will in 1204 that she was to rule alongside their son in the event of his death, including taking responsibility for paying his debts and executing his will. It was she who persuaded him to marry their daughter Berengaria to Alfonso IX of León. Troubadours and sages were regularly present in Alfonso VIII's court due to Eleanor's patronage.

Eleanor took a particular interest in supporting religious institutions.  In 1179, she took responsibility to support and maintain a shrine to St. Thomas Becket in the cathedral of Toledo.  She also created and supported the Abbey of Santa María la Real de Las Huelgas, which served as a refuge and tomb for her family for generations, and its affiliated hospital.

Regent
When Alfonso died, Eleanor was reportedly so devastated with grief that she was unable to preside over the burial. Their eldest daughter Berengaria instead performed these honours. In accordance with the will of her late spouse, Eleanor became regent of Castile during the minority of her son, in which her daughter acted as her advisor.  Her reign was not to be long, however; she was reportedly not in good enough health and left most of the affairs of state to her daughter, which created fear and opposition among the nobles that she was planning to leave the regency to her daughter.

Eleanor later became sick and died only twenty-six days after her husband, and was buried at Abbey of Santa María la Real de Las Huelgas.

Children

Later depictions
Eleanor was praised for her beauty and regal nature by the poet Ramón Vidal de Besalú after her death.  Her great-grandson Alfonso X referred to her as "noble and much loved".

Eleanor was played by actress Ida Norden in the silent film The Jewess of Toledo.

Notes

References

Sources
 Andrews, J.F. (2023) The Families of Eleanor of Aquitaine: A Female Network of Power in the Middle Ages (The History Press)
 Bowie, Colette (2014), The Daughters of Henry II and Eleanor of Aquitaine (Brepols)
Cerda, José Manuel (2011), La dot gasconne d'Aliénor d'Angleterre. Entre royaume de Castille, royaume de France et royaume d'Angleterre, Cahiers de civilisation médiévale, ISSN 0007-9731, Vol. 54, Nº 215, 2011.

Cerda, José Manuel (2013), "The marriage of Alfonso VIII of Castile and Leonor Plantagenet : the first bond between Spain and England in the Middle Ages", Les stratégies matrimoniales dans l’aristocratie (xe-xiiie siècles), ed. Martin Aurell.
Cerda, José Manuel (2016), "Matrimonio y patrimonio. La carta de arras de Leonor Plantagenet, reina consorte de Castilla", Anuario de Estudios Medievales, vol. 46.
Cerda, José Manuel (2016), Leonor Plantagenet and the cult of Thomas Becket in Castile, The cult of St Thomas Becket in the Plantagenet World, ed. P. Webster and M.P. Gelin, Boydell Press.
Cerda, José Manuel (2018), "Diplomacia, mecenazgo e identidad dinástica. La consorte Leonor y el influjo de la cultura Plantagenet en la Castilla de Alfonso VIII", Los modelos anglonormandos en la cultura letrada de Castilla, ed. Amaia Arizaleta y Francisco Bautista (Toulouse).
Cerda, José Manuel (2019), "Un documento inédito y desconocido de la cancillería de la reina Leonor Plantagenet", En la España Medieval, vol. 42.
 Cerda, José Manuel (2021), Leonor de Inglaterra. La reina Plantagenet de Castilla (1161-1214), Gijón, Trea ediciones.

 
Rada Jiménez, Rodrigo. Historia de los hechos de España.

External links

Adrian Fletcher’s Paradoxplace – Leonora’s Tomb in the Cistercian Nunnery of Santa Maria de Real Huelgas in Burgos, Spain
Eight hundredth anniversary of Alfonso and Leonor's deaths

1160s births
1214 deaths
12th-century nobility from León and Castile
13th-century Castilians
Burials at the Abbey of Santa María la Real de Las Huelgas
Castilian queen consorts
English princesses
House of Plantagenet
People from Orne
House of Anjou
12th-century English women
Children of Henry II of England
Anglo-Normans
Daughters of kings
Queen mothers
13th-century women rulers